The Men's sprint at the 2011 UCI Track Cycling World Championships was held on March 24 and 25. The qualifying, first round, second round, second round repechages and quarterfinals took place on 24 March. The Semifinals and Finals took place on 25 March.

In January 2012, Grégory Baugé was stripped of his world title, following the nullification of his 2011 results after a 12-month backdated ban for drug test infringements.

Format
50 athletes participated in the contest. After the qualifying heats, the fastest 24 riders advanced to the 1/16 finals.

The first rider in each of the 12 heats advanced to the second round. There was no repechage for this round.

The first rider from each of the six Second Round heats advanced to the Quarterfinals and the second placed riders advanced to a repechage to determine the other two riders that competed the quarterfinals.

The first rider in each quarterfinal advanced to the semifinals and the 4 losing athletes raced for 5th-8th place.

Results

Qualifying
The Qualifying was held at 14:15.

1/16 Finals
1/16 Finals were held at 16:55.

1/8 Finals
1/8 Finals were held at 19:30.

1/8 Finals Repechage
1/8 Finals Repechage was held at 20:10.

Quarterfinals
The Quarterfinals were held at 20:30, 20:55 and 21:20.

Race for 5th-8th Places 
The Race for 5th-8th Places was held at 21:50.

Semifinals
The semifinals were held at 18:50 and 19:05.

Finals
The finals were held at 20:45, 21:15 and 21:40.

See also
2011 UCI Para-cycling Track World Championships – Men's sprint

References

2011 UCI Track Cycling World Championships
UCI Track Cycling World Championships – Men's sprint